Ralph Foster "Cy" Perkins (February 27, 1896 – October 2, 1963) was an American professional baseball player, coach and manager. He played as a catcher in Major League Baseball most notably for the Philadelphia Athletics. He was born in Gloucester, Massachusetts.

 Perkins served as a catcher with the Philadelphia Athletics (1915, 1917–30), New York Yankees (1931) and Detroit Tigers (1934). He was the starting catcher for Philadelphia until Mickey Cochrane joined the team in 1925. After that Perkins served as a backup, being hailed as the man who taught Cochrane to catch without injuring his hands. He also was a member of the Athletics' World Series champion teams in 1929 and 1930. 
 
In 17 MLB seasons and 1,171 games played, Perkins was a .259 hitter with 933 hits, 175 doubles, 35 triples, 30 home runs, and 409 runs batted in.
 
Following his playing career, Perkins coached for 17 years in the Major Leagues with the Yankees (1932–33), Tigers (1934–39) and Philadelphia Phillies (1946–54). He worked with two World Series champions, the Yankees of 1932 and the Tigers of 1935, and for two league pennant-winners, the  Tigers and the  Phillies. He also managed Detroit in 1937 (along with Cochrane and Del Baker) and posted a 6–9 record.
 
Cy Perkins died in Philadelphia at the age of 67, and was interred in Oak Grove Cemetery in his native Gloucester.

External links

Rogers, C. Paul III, Cy Perkins, Society for American Baseball Research Biography Project
The Deadball Era – obituary
 The Virtual Card Collection

1896 births
1963 deaths
American expatriate baseball players in Mexico
Atlanta Crackers players
Baseball coaches from Massachusetts
Baseball players from Massachusetts
Detroit Tigers coaches
Detroit Tigers managers
Detroit Tigers players
Industriales de Monterrey players
Major League Baseball catchers
Minor league baseball managers
New York Yankees coaches
New York Yankees players
Philadelphia Athletics players
Philadelphia Phillies coaches
Raleigh Capitals players
Rojos del Águila de Veracruz players
Sportspeople from Gloucester, Massachusetts